Walayat Abad is a village in Samote Union Council of Kallar Syedan Tehsil, Rawalpindi District in the Punjab Province of Pakistan.

References

External links
Department of Education

Populated places in Kallar Syedan Tehsil
Villages in Samote union council